Hsieh Su-wei and Barbora Strýcová were the defending champions and successfully defended their title, defeating Barbora Krejčíková and Zheng Saisai in the final, 7–5, 3–6, [10–5].

Seeds
The top four seeds received a bye into the second round.

Draw

Finals

Top half

Bottom half

References

External links
Main Draw

Women's Doubles
2020 WTA Tour